The coat of arms of Ascension Island were granted in August 2012. Prior to this the island used the coat of arms of the United Kingdom for official purposes.

See also
Flag of Ascension Island

References

External links
College of Arms June 2013 Newsletter (No. 35)

Ascension Island
Ascension Island
Ascension Island
Ascension Island
Ascension Island
Ascension Island
Ascension Island
Ascension Island